Kelly Rutherford (born November 6, 1968) is an American actress. She is known for her television roles as Stephanie "Sam" Whitmore on the NBC daytime soap opera Generations (1989–1991), as Megan Lewis on the Fox primetime soap opera Melrose Place (1996–1999), and as Lily van der Woodsen on The CW series Gossip Girl (2007–2012).

Early life and education
Kelly Rutherford was born in Elizabethtown, Kentucky, on November 6, 1968, the daughter of Ann Edwards.  She has a brother, Anthony. She attended Corona del Mar High School in Newport Beach, California. She later studied at HB Studio in New York City, and the Beverly Hills Playhouse in California.

Career
Rutherford began her career on daytime soap operas. She appeared on Loving in 1987, and later was cast as a regular on Generations from 1989 to 1991. In 1992 she joined the cast of the ABC drama Homefront.

From 1993 to 1994, Rutherford was a regular on the Fox series The Adventures of Brisco County, Jr. as Dixie Cousins, a saloon singer and con artist who has a brief romantic encounter with Brisco. In later episodes, Dixie becomes Brisco's primary love interest.

She also appeared in the film I Love Trouble. She also starred in the short-lived series The Great Defender as Frankie Collet (1995), and in Kindred: The Embraced as Caitlin Byrne (1996). In 1996, Rutherford joined the cast of Fox primetime soap opera Melrose Place, as Megan Lewis. She starred on the show until 1999.

She also starred as Christine Hamilton in the horror film Scream 3 (2000). From 2003 to 2004, she starred in the ABC drama Threat Matrix as Special Agent Frankie Ellroy Kilmer. In next television season she starred in another short-lived series, E-Ring, on NBC. In 2007, Rutherford began starring as Lily van der Woodsen in the CW series Gossip Girl. The series ended in 2012. Rutherford has also starred in a number of Lifetime movies. In 2016, Rutherford was cast in the ABC thriller Quantico playing the recurring role of Laura Wyatt. From 2018 to 2019, Rutherford played the recurring role of Melissa Daniels in the CW reboot series Dynasty.

Personal life
Rutherford married Venezuelan banker Carlos Tarajano in June 2001. Rutherford filed for divorce in January 2002, after six months of marriage. The wedding was featured shortly thereafter in the February 2002 issue of InStyle magazine.

Rutherford married her second husband, German businessman Daniel Giersch, in August 2006. She gave birth to their first child, son Hermés Gustaf Daniel Giersch, in October 2006.

While pregnant with their second child, Rutherford filed for divorce from Giersch on December 30, 2008. Rutherford and Giersch subsequently became involved in a child custody dispute over their son and their unborn child. Rutherford gave birth to their second child, daughter Helena, in June 2009.

In August 2009, Rutherford and Giersch reached a temporary settlement of joint physical custody, in effect until April 2010. Rutherford also obtained a temporary restraining order against him the following month.

Giersch's U.S. visa was revoked in April 2012, after Rutherford's lawyer informed the State Department about issues pertaining to Giersch's businesses, which led the department to conclude that they had sufficient evidence to deport him.

It has been reported that the allegations involved fraud or an involvement in drugs and weapons dealing in South America, considered terrorism under the PATRIOT Act. Giersch consequently was unable to enter the United States and took up residence in France and Monaco. In May 2012, Rutherford and Giersch's children went to France to spend the summer with their father. Rutherford asked the court to grant her sole custody so that she could keep the children primarily in the United States following their visit to France, as the existing joint custody agreement required her to travel frequently to enable Giersch to spend time with the children.

In August 2012, in a widely reported decision, a California Superior Court judge ruled that the 50/50 custody arrangement should remain and that, because Giersch is unable to travel to the United States, the children should live in France with him and attend school there, with Rutherford traveling there to visit them. Though Rutherford opposed the decision and requested a stay of proceedings while she appealed, her request was denied and it was ruled that, in two years, his eligibility to enter the United States and the consequent well-being of the children will be reassessed.

In June 2013, Rutherford filed for bankruptcy, stating she had debts of approximately $2 million, primarily due to the $1.5 million she spent on legal fees relating to the divorce and custody dispute with Giersch.

In May 2015, Rutherford was granted temporary sole custody of her children, following a ruling that both her son and daughter be brought back to the United States from Monaco, where they had been living with their father since 2012. On July 23, 2015, a California judge ruled that California did not have jurisdiction over Rutherford's child custody case because she resides in New York, and her former husband was again awarded custody.

Rutherford then filed a case in New York but on July 27, 2015, the New York court ruled it also did not have jurisdiction.

In December 2015, the Monaco courts reconfirmed that full custody remained with the children's father, with Rutherford granted extensive visitation rights in France and Monaco as well as shared input regarding "health, schooling, religious education, and any change of residence".

Filmography

Film

Television

References

External links

 
 

1968 births
Living people
20th-century American actresses
21st-century American actresses
Actresses from Kentucky
American film actresses
American soap opera actresses
American television actresses
People from Elizabethtown, Kentucky